Gyeongsang Gamyeong Park is a park that is located in Daegu Jung-gu, South Korea.
The area of park is about 16,500 m².
It is called 'Jungang Park' as located in middle of Daegu, It is changed into 'Gyeongsang Gamyeong Park'

References
 http://100.naver.com/100.nhn?docid=741840

Parks in Daegu
Jung District, Daegu